Huddleston is a surname. Notable people with the surname include:

 Amelia Edith Huddleston Barr (1831–1919), British novelist
 Arthur Huddleston (1880–1948), British colonial civil servant
 David Huddleston (1930–2016), American actor
 David Huddleston (Canadian general), Commander, Air Command from 1991 to 1993
 David Winfield Huddleston (born 1943), American minister and author
 Deserie Huddleston (born 1960), Australian sport shooter
 Ernest Whiteside Huddleston (1874–1959), Indian Navy officer
 Ferdinand Huddleston (1812–1890), English cricketer
 Floyd Huddleston (1918–1991), American songwriter, screenwriter, and TV producer
 George Huddleston (1869–1960), American Congressman
 George Huddleston Jr. (1920–1971), American Congressman
Gertie Huddleston (c. 1916–2013), Australian Aboriginal artist
 Holly Huddleston (born 1987), New Zealand cricketer
 Hubert Huddleston (1880–1950), British Army officer
 John Huddleston (disambiguation)
 John Walter Huddleston (1815–1890), English judge
 Mac Huddleston (born 1943), American politician
 Mark Huddleston, American academic administrator
 Mike Huddleston, American comic book artist
 Nicholas Huddleston (fl. 1404), English politician
 Nigel Huddleston (born 1970), English politician
 Richard Huddleston (disambiguation)
 Robert Huddleston (born 1955), American politician
 Rodney Huddleston (born 1937), English-Australian linguist and grammarian
 Sisley Huddleston (1883–1952), British journalist and writer
 T. F. C. Huddleston (1848–1936), British scholar
 T. J. Huddleston Sr. (1876–1959), African American entrepreneur
 Trevor Huddleston (1913–1998), English Anglican bishop
 Vicki J. Huddleston (born 1942), American diplomat
 Walter Dee Huddleston (1926-2018), American politician
 William Huddleston (disambiguation)
 Willoughby Baynes Huddleston (1866–1953), Royal Indian Marine officer
 William Emanuel Huddleston aka [Yusef Abdul Lateef] (1920-2013) multi-instrumentalist

Places

United States
 Huddleston, Arkansas
 Huddleston, Missouri
 Huddleston, Virginia

See also
 Hudleston